Birmingham City Football Club, an English association football club based in the city of Birmingham, was founded in 1875 under the name of Small Heath Alliance. They first entered the FA Cup in the 1881–82 season. When nationally organised league football in England began, the club, by then called simply Small Heath F.C., was a founder member of the Football Alliance, formed the year after the Football League. In 1892, the Football League decided to form a Second Division, inviting the members of the Football Alliance to join; as one of the less successful members, Small Heath were placed in the Second Division. Since that time the club's first team has competed in numerous nationally and internationally organised competitions, and all players who have played in 100 or more such matches are listed below.

Each player's details include the duration of his Birmingham career, his typical playing position while with the club, and the number of games played and goals scored in domestic league matches and in all senior competitive matches. Where applicable, the list also includes the national team for which the player was selected, and the number of senior international caps he won.

Introduction
As of the date specified below, more than 200 men had made 100 or more appearances in senior competitive matches for Birmingham. Frank Womack holds the club record for league appearances, having played 491 matches between 1908 and 1928, closely followed by Gil Merrick with 485 between 1946 and 1959. If all senior competitions are included, Merrick has 551, followed by Womack's 515 which is the record for an outfield player. The goalscoring record is held by Joe Bradford, with 249 league goals, and 267 in total, scored between 1920 and 1935. No other player comes close: Trevor Francis is the nearest with 119 league goals, 133 in total, scored between 1970 and 1979. Bradford holds the record for league goals scored in a top-flight season with 29 in the 1927–28 First Division. A club record for transfer fee received was set when Ché Adams joined Southampton in 2019; officially undisclosed, it was reported as £15 million. Forty years earlier, Trevor Francis became the first player transferred between British clubs for a £1 million fee, and in 1896, future England international forward Fred Wheldon joined league champions Aston Villa for terms reportedly "higher than have ever been concluded": a fee of £350 plus the proceeds of a friendly match between the clubs. Caesar Jenkyns was the first man capped by his country while a Birmingham (then Small Heath) player when he represented Wales against Ireland in February 1892. The player with most senior international caps while at the club is Maik Taylor with 58 for Northern Ireland, and Harry Hibbs has most for England, with 25.

Bob McRoberts, Billy Beer, George Liddell, Merrick, Garry Pendrey, Francis and Gary Rowett all went on to manage the team. Others took part in significant matches in club history. Billy Ollis, Jenkyns, Ted Devey, Jack Hallam, Wheldon and Tommy Hands appeared in Small Heath's first Football League match in 1892. Eight men listed here played in Birmingham's pioneering venture into club football in Europe in the 1955–58 Inter-Cities Fairs Cup, and ten played on the losing side in the 1956 FA Cup Final (an eleventh, Roy Warhurst, missed the match through injury). In more recent times, Paul Tait scored the first golden goal to decide a Wembley cup final, against Carlisle United in the 1995 Football League Trophy. Geoff Horsfield scored the extra-time equaliser that took the 2002 First Division play-off final into a shootout; Paul Devlin and Stan Lazaridis converted their spot-kicks as Birmingham were promoted to the Premier League for the first time. Seven men listed here, including captain Stephen Carr and goalscorer Nikola Žigić, took the field as Birmingham won the 2011 League Cup; another two were unused substitutes. Just three years later, the first headed goal of full-back Paul Caddis's career, 93 minutes into the final match of the season, saved the team from relegation to the third tier of English football.

Key
The list is ordered first by number of appearances in total, then by number of League appearances, and then if necessary by date of debut.
Appearances as a substitute are included.
Statistics are correct up to and including the match played on 18 March 2023. Where a player left the club permanently after this date, his statistics are updated to his date of leaving.

Players with 100 or more appearances

{|class="wikitable sortable plainrowheaders" style="text-align:center;"
|+ Table of players, including playing position, club statistics and international selection
|-
!scope=col rowspan=2|Player
!scope=col rowspan=2|Pos
!scope=col rowspan=2|Club career
!scope=col colspan=2|League
!scope=col colspan=2|Total
!scope=col rowspan=2|Internationalselection
!scope=col rowspan=2 data-sort-type=number|Caps
!scope=col rowspan=2 class=unsortable|Notes
!scope=col rowspan=2 class=unsortable|Refs
|-class=unsortable
!scope=col data-sort-type=number|Apps
!scope=col data-sort-type=number|Goals
!scope=col data-sort-type=number|Apps
!scope=col data-sort-type=number|Goals
|-
!scope=row| 
|GK||1946–1959||485||0||551||0||style=text-align:left|||23
|||
|-
!scope=row|
|FB||1908–1928||491||0||515||0||style=text-align:left| trial||—||||
|-
!scope=row| 
|FW||1920–1935||414||249||445||267||style=text-align:left|||12||||
|-
!scope=row|
|FB||1947–1958||401||3||440||3||style=text-align:left| England B||—
|||
|-
!scope=row|
|FW||1920–1932||409||71||432||72||style=text-align:left|||1||||
|-
!scope=row|
|DF||1953–1964||365||3||430||3||style=text-align:left|||2||||
|-
!scope=row|
|MF||1960–1970||350||28||404||34||style=text-align:left| youth||—||||
|-
!scope=row|
|GK||1919–1931||382||0||395||0||style=text-align:left|||1||||
|-
!scope=row| 
|DF / MF||1965–1980||336||9||392||10||style=text-align:left|||28||||
|-
!scope=row|
|GK||1926–1939||358||0||388||0||style=text-align:left|||25
|||
|-
!scope=row| $
|DF||1964–1975||334||1||378||1||—||—||||
|-
!scope=row| 
|DF||1969–1979||306||4||360||5||—||—||||
|-
!scope=row|
|FW / HB||1899–1912||329||23||355||25||—||—||||
|-
!scope=row|
|GK||1993–2004||287||0||354||0||—||—||||
|-
!scope=row|
|HB||1914–1928||331||13||349||14||style=text-align:left|||7||||
|-
!scope=row|
|FB / HB||1920–1932||323||6||345||6||—||—||||
|-
!scope=row| 
|DF||1973–1981||286||17||337||23||style=text-align:left| England B||—||||
|-
!scope=row| $
|DF / MF||1986–1996||274||23||336||26||—||—||||
|-
!scope=row| $
|FW||1970–1979||280||119||329||133||style=text-align:left|||12||||
|-
!scope=row|
|FW||1924–1933||298||98||324||107||—||—||||
|-
!scope=row| $
|DF||1995–2003||262||13||314||18||style=text-align:left|||12||||
|-
!scope=row|
|FW / HB||1934–1950||280||61||310||69||—||—||||
|-
!scope=row|
|GK||1899–1908||283||0||306||0||style=text-align:left| trial||—||||
|-
!scope=row| *$
|FW||2016–present||278||58||293||61||—||—
|||
|-
!scope=row|
|FW / FB||1936–1954||268||67||291||72||—||—||||
|-
!scope=row|
|MF||1997–2004||248||34||291||42||—||—||||
|-
!scope=row|
|HB||1923–1934||260||12||284||12||—||—||||
|-
!scope=row|
|FB||1928–1937||256||9||284||9||—||—||||
|-
!scope=row|
|HB||1949–1956||255||14||281||15||style=text-align:left| England B||—||||
|-
!scope=row|
|FW||1952–1960||244||107||277||127||—||—||||
|-
!scope=row|
|FW||1953–1961||235||60||271||67||style=text-align:left|||2||||
|-
!scope=row|
|HB||1927–1936||243||5||266||7||—||—||||
|-
!scope=row| $
|DF||1997–2004||226||25||266||28||—||—||||
|-
!scope=row| 
|FB||1951–1959||227||1||265||1||style=text-align:left|||17||||
|-
!scope=row|
|FW||1964–1970||221||79||253||94||—||—||||
|-
!scope=row|
|FW||data-sort-value="1901–1913"|||236||99||251||102||style=text-align:left| trial||—||||
|-
!scope=row|
|HB||1902–1909||236||34||250||35||—||—||||
|-
!scope=row|
|HB||1952–1963||206||3||248||3||—||—||||
|-
!scope=row| *
|DF||2017–present||234||7||246||7||style=text-align:left|||—||||
|-
!scope=row|
|HB||1930–1938||230||2||246||2||style=text-align:left|||3||||
|-
!scope=row|
|GK||2003–2011||214||0||242||0||style=text-align:left|||58||||
|-
!scope=row| $
|GK||1969–1978||206||0||240||0||—||—||||
|-
!scope=row|
|HB||1950–1957||213||10||239||10||—||—||||
|-
!scope=row|
|FB||1920–1927||228||1||237||1||style=text-align:left| trial||—||||
|-
!scope=row|
|GK||1952–1965||212||0||237||0||—||—||||
|-
!scope=row|
|FW / HB||1889–1902||201||56||232||70||—||—||||
|-
!scope=row| $
|MF||1965–1971||196||8||231||13||style=text-align:left|||0||||
|-
!scope=row|
|MF||1996–2002||187||16||223||19||style=text-align:left|||2||||
|-
!scope=row|
|MF||1999–2006||191||8||222||8||style=text-align:left|||33||||
|-
!scope=row|
|HB||1895–1902||199||21||221||23||style=text-align:left|||0||||
|-
!scope=row|
|FW||1948–1954||203||51||218||54||—||—||||
|-
!scope=row|
|DF||1962–1970||183||1||217||1||style=text-align:left|||15||||
|-
!scope=row| 
|FW||1971–1976||175||58||217||73||—||—||||
|-
!scope=row| $
|MF||2002–2010||193||4||216||4||style=text-align:left|||42||||
|-
!scope=row|
|U||1936–1950||192||12||214||14||—||—||||
|-
!scope=row|
|FB||1903–1910||199||1||213||1||style=text-align:left| trial||—||||
|-
!scope=row| $
|DF||1984–1990||187||0||213||0||—||—||||
|-
!scope=row|
|DF||1986–1991||182||3||213||4||style=text-align:left| youth||—||||
|-
!scope=row|
|FW||1957–1964||178||30||213||33||style=text-align:left|||2||||
|-
!scope=row|
|GK||1965–1970||181||0||212||0||style=text-align:left|||8||||
|-
!scope=row|
|MF||1988–1997||170||14||212||18||—||—||||
|-
!scope=row|
|MF||1977–1983||186||15||211||19||style=text-align:left|||—||||
|-
!scope=row|
|MF||1970–1975||175||11||209||14||style=text-align:left|||—||||
|-
!scope=row| $
|DF||1970–1975||171||4||207||5||—||—||||
|-
!scope=row| $
|MF||2006–2011||184||19||205||25||style=text-align:left|||31||||
|-
!scope=row| 
|FW / MF||data-sort-value="1983–1991"|||173||29||205||34||—||—||||
|-
!scope=row| $
|DF / FW||1971–1977||170||45||205||53||style=text-align:left|||8||||
|-
!scope=row|
|FW||1970–1975||166||9||204||11||—||—||||
|-
!scope=row|
|DF||1989–1993||168||12||203||13||—||—||||
|-
!scope=row|
|FW||2006–2011||181||37||202||42||style=text-align:left|||—||||
|-
!scope=row|
|MF||1961–1965||178||3||202||3||style=text-align:left|||16||||
|-
!scope=row| $
|DF||1998–2004||168||9||200||11||style=text-align:left|||—||||
|-
!scope=row|
|HB||1912–1923||192||4||198||4||—||—||||
|-
!scope=row| *$
|DF||2017–present||189||8||198||9||—||—||||
|-
!scope=row|
|FW||1903–1908||185||44||198||47||—||—||||
|-
!scope=row|
|HB||1957–1961||165||15||197||18||style=text-align:left|||—||||
|-
!scope=row|
|MF||1984–1989||168||5||196||5||style=text-align:left|||0||||
|-
!scope=row| $
|MF||2014–2020||182||10||194||11||—||—||||
|-
!scope=row|
|MF||1964–1970||171||41||193||44||style=text-align:left| youth||—||||
|-
!scope=row| 
|FW||1969–1974||160||68||193||84||style=text-align:left|||0||||
|-
!scope=row|
|FB / HB||1948–1956||175||4||190||4||—||—||||
|-
!scope=row|
|HB||1930–1938||183||8||189||9||—||—||||
|-
!scope=row|
|FW||1898–1905||173||70||187||82||—||—||{{efn|name=Blackpool|Reliable sources differ widely on the scorers in Small Heath's 10–1 win at home to Blackpool on 2 March 1901. This article uses the ''English National Football Archive (ENFA)s versionMcMillan 5, Aston 2, Archer, McRoberts, and Whartonas likely the result of more recent research.}}||
|-
!scope=row| 
|FW||1953–1958||166||53||187||60||—||—||||
|-
!scope=row|
|FW||1988–1993||150||30||186||38||—||—||||
|-
!scope=row|
|FW||1954–1958||158||74||185||90||—||—||||
|-
!scope=row|
|MF||2015–2021||170||5||184||6||style=text-align:left|||—||||
|-
!scope=row|
|DF||2014–2019||174||14||183||15||style=text-align:left| England C||—
|||
|-
!scope=row|
|FW||1928–1933||165||45||182||54||style=text-align:left|||2||||
|-
!scope=row|
|MF||2015–2020||168||20||180||21||style=text-align:left|||24||||
|-
!scope=row|
|DF||2011–2017||153||0||179||1||style=text-align:left|||5||||
|-
!scope=row|
|GK||1988–1993||144||0||176||0||style=text-align:left|||0||||
|-
!scope=row|
|MF||1989–1992||142||33||176||43||—||—||||
|-
!scope=row| $
|DF||2012–2018||158||3||175||4||style=text-align:left|||—||||
|-
!scope=row|
|FW||1890–1896||155||96||175||113||style=text-align:left|||0||||
|-
!scope=row|
|DF||2007–2012||152||9||175||11||style=text-align:left|||—||||
|-
!scope=row| *
|DF||2017–present||164||7||173||7||style=text-align:left| England C||—
|||
|-
!scope=row| 
|DF / MF||1977–1984||153||10||173||10||—||—||||
|-
!scope=row|
|FW||1953–1958||149||48||173||55||style=text-align:left|||3||||
|-
!scope=row|
|DF||1988–1993||136||0||171||0||—||—||||
|-
!scope=row|
|DF||2014–2018||158||4||170||5||—||—||||
|-
!scope=row|
|FB||1897–1902||154||4||170||4||—||—||||
|-
!scope=row|
|DF||1961–1968||153||2||170||2||—||—||||
|-
!scope=row|
|FW||1897–1903||151||18||167||23||style=text-align:left| unofficial||—||||
|-
!scope=row|
|DF||1982–1986||137||0||167||0||style=text-align:left|||—||||
|-
!scope=row|
|FB||1954–1961||134||0||166||0||—||—||||
|-
!scope=row| *
|MF||2018–present||155||14||165||14||style=text-align:left|||—
|||
|-
!scope=row|
|FB||1911–1921||152||0||165||0||style=text-align:left| Victory International||—||||
|-
!scope=row|
|FB||1930–1935||150||2||163||2||—||—||||
|-
!scope=row|
|DF||2018–2022||155||9||161||9||style=text-align:left|||1||||
|-
!scope=row|
|DF / MF||1972–1979||145||4||160||5||style=text-align:left|||—||||
|-
!scope=row|
|DF||data-sort-value="2012–2017"|||149||15||159||16||style=text-align:left|||1||||
|-
!scope=row|
|FW||data-sort-value="2010–2015"|||137||32||159||36||style=text-align:left|||15||||
|-
!scope=row|
|MF||1991–1996||116||18||159||20||style=text-align:left|||—||||
|-
!scope=row|
|DF||1984–1988||137||0||158||0||style=text-align:left|||—||||
|-
!scope=row|
|FW||1933–1938||147||46||156||50||—||—||||
|-
!scope=row|
|HB||1888–1895||131||18||155||20||style=text-align:left|||4||||
|-
!scope=row| $
|MF||2011–2014||131||24||155||27||style=text-align:left|||5||||
|-
!scope=row|
|MF||1979–1983||130||11||155||15||style=text-align:left|||—||||
|-
!scope=row|
|HB||1888–1895||136||6||153||10||—||—||||
|-
!scope=row|
|FW||1996–2002||131||50||153||56||style=text-align:left| England semi-pro||—||||
|-
!scope=row|
|FW||1998–2001||129||31||152||42||—||—||||
|-
!scope=row|
|HB||1922–1928||146||0||151||0||—||—||||
|-
!scope=row|
|FW||1890–1895||133||54||151||62||style=text-align:left|||0||||
|-
!scope=row|
|FW||1890–1896||135||39||150||42||—||—||||
|-
!scope=row|
|FW||1934–1946||134||63||150||71||style=text-align:left|||2||||
|-
!scope=row|
|MF||1986–1993||120||8||150||12||—||—||||
|-
!scope=row|
|MF||1965–1969||128||2||149||2||style=text-align:left| Scottish Schools||—||||
|-
!scope=row|
|DF||1961–1965||130||26||147||30||—||—||||
|-
!scope=row|
|FW||1960–1964||122||28||146||32||style=text-align:left|||—||||
|-
!scope=row| $
|DF||1978–1983||130||1||145||1||style=text-align:left|||—||||
|-
!scope=row|
|FW||1961–1965||125||26||145||31||style=text-align:left|||0||||
|-
!scope=row|
|FB||1956–1962||117||0||145||0||—||—||||
|-
!scope=row|
|DF||2002–2006||134||0||144||0||style=text-align:left|||32||||
|-
!scope=row|
|MF||2009–2013||121||9||144||9||style=text-align:left|||16||||
|-
!scope=row|
|HB||1927–1931||132||0||143||0||—||—||||
|-
!scope=row|
|DF||1978–1984||123||1||143||1||style=text-align:left|||0||||
|-
!scope=row|
|HB||1909–1915||137||7||142||7||—||—||||
|-
!scope=row|
|FB||1896–1901||129||1||142||1||—||—||||
|-
!scope=row|
|MF||1997–2002||124||8||142||8||style=text-align:left|||14||||
|-
!scope=row|
|FW||1977–1981||118||29||141||41||style=text-align:left|||—||||
|-
!scope=row| $
|||data-sort-value="1996–2003"|||123||32||139||38||style=text-align:left|||10
|||
|-
!scope=row|
|U||1934–1947||131||17||137||17||style=text-align:left|||2||||
|-
!scope=row|
|HB||1938–1950||119||4||137||4||—||—||||
|-
!scope=row| $
|DF||1983–1986||111||8||137||14
|style=text-align:left| England B||—||||
|-
!scope=row|
|HB||1902–1907||130||3||136||3||—||—||||
|-
!scope=row| $
|MF||2003–2007||121||8||135||9||style=text-align:left|||—||||
|-
!scope=row|
|MF||data-sort-value="1981–1988"|||118||6||135||12||style=text-align:left| youth||—||||
|-
!scope=row|
|HB||1891–1896||121||2||134||2||—||—||||
|-
!scope=row|
|MF||1974–1977||115||16||134||18||style=text-align:left|||0||||
|-
!scope=row|
|MF||1983–1987||111||5||134||7||—||—||||
|-
!scope=row|
|MF / FW||1997–2001||107||22||134||27||style=text-align:left|||12||||
|-
!scope=row| *
|MF||2019–present||124||6||133||6||style=text-align:left|||0||||
|-
!scope=row|
|DF||2008–2013||106||7||132||13||style=text-align:left| youth||—||||
|-
!scope=row|
|FW||1967–1972||118||46||131||52||style=text-align:left| youth||—||||
|-
!scope=row|
|DF||2003–2007||113||5||128||5||style=text-align:left|||7||||
|-
!scope=row|
|FW||1963–1967||112||23||128||25||—||—||||
|-
!scope=row|
|DF||1972–1977||101||1||128||2||style=text-align:left| youth||—||||       
|-
!scope=row|
|DF||1968–1972||112||2||127||4||—||—||||
|-
!scope=row|
|HB||1931–1935||114||5||126||5||—||—||||
|-
!scope=row| $
|FW||2000–2003||108||23||126||29||—||—||||
|-
!scope=row|
|MF||2014–2018||117||6||125||6||style=text-align:left|||2||||
|-
!scope=row|
|HB||1913–1922||116||4||125||4||—||—||||
|-
!scope=row|
|MF||data-sort-value="2010–2019"|||109||14||125||16
|style=text-align:left|||—||||
|-
!scope=row| $
|MF||1978–1981||108||16||125||22||style=text-align:left| youth||—||||
|-
!scope=row| *
|FW||2020–present||118||34||124||34||style=text-align:left|||3
|||
|-
!scope=row|
|FB||1904–1907||116||2||124||2||—||—||||
|-
!scope=row|
|DF||1996–1999||104||1||124||2||style=text-align:left| England B||—||||
|-
!scope=row| $
|FW||2016–2019||116||34||123||38||||
|||
|-
!scope=row|
|MF||1975–1978||110||11||122||11||—||—||||
|-
!scope=row|
|DF||2009–2012||106||0||121||0||style=text-align:left|||0||||
|-
!scope=row|
|FW||1961–1964||105||49||121||60||style=text-align:left|||5||||
|-
!scope=row|
|FW||1956–1961||100||23||121||27||style=text-align:left|||—||||
|-
!scope=row|
|HB||1909–1919||113||4||120||4||—||—||||
|-
!scope=row|
|FW||1911–1921||110||16||120||19||—||—||||
|-
!scope=row| $
|FW||1994–1996||88||35||120||42||—||—||||
|-
!scope=row|
|FW||1957–1960||105||34||119||42||style=text-align:left| England B||—||||
|-
!scope=row|
|FW||1986–1989||103||31||119||36||—||—||||
|-
!scope=row|
|FW||1921–1926||113||11||118||11||—||—||||
|-
!scope=row| $
|GK||1979–1982||102||0||118||0||—||—||||
|-
!scope=row| $
|FW||data-sort-value="2003–2008"|||101||30||118||37||style=text-align:left|||28
|||
|-
!scope=row|
|FW||2014–2017||113||32||117||33||||||||
|-
!scope=row|
|MF||data-sort-value="1988–1992"|||101||6||117||9||—||—||||
|-
!scope=row|
|DF||2004–2009||99||2||117||3||style=text-align:left|||—||||
|-
!scope=row|
|FB||1927–1932||111||0||116||1||—||—||||
|-
!scope=row|
|FW||1931–1936||108||17||116||18||style=text-align:left|||3||||
|-
!scope=row|
|GK||1960–1964||98||0||116||0||style=text-align:left| English Schools||—||||
|-
!scope=row|
|MF||1990–1993||95||13||116||16||—||—||||
|-
!scope=row|
|FW||1919–1923||110||31||115||35||—||—||||
|-
!scope=row|
|MF||1979–1982||97||12||115||14||style=text-align:left|||10||||
|-
!scope=row|
|FW||1958–1961||96||32||115||40||—||—||||
|-
!scope=row|
|FW||1960–1964||93||37||115||53||style=text-align:left|||—||||
|-
!scope=row|
|FW||1947–1951||104||6||114||6||style=text-align:left|||0||||
|-
!scope=row| $
|GK||1980–1984||94||0||114||0||style=text-align:left| England B||—||||
|-
!scope=row|
|GK||1902–1912||106||0||111||0||—||—||||
|-
!scope=row|
|FB||1936–1947||105||0||111||0||style=text-align:left|||10||||
|-
!scope=row|
|FW||1983–1988||95||12||111||16||style=text-align:left|||1||||
|-
!scope=row|
|MF||2014–2017||103||14||109||15||style=text-align:left|||4||||
|-
!scope=row|
|FW||1939–1949||94||32||109||37||—||—||||
|-
!scope=row|
|FW||1982–1984||92||25||109||33||style=text-align:left|||0||||
|-
!scope=row|
|FW||1946–1949||93||15||108||18||style=text-align:left|||1||||
|-
!scope=row|
|DF||1979–1982||93||0||108||0||style=text-align:left|||0||||
|-
!scope=row|
|DF||1957–1962||91||0||107||0||—||—||||
|-
!scope=row|
|FW||1901–1905||100||12||106||13||style=text-align:left|||0||||
|-
!scope=row|
|HB||1946–1949||93||6||106||8||—||—||||
|-
!scope=row|
|HB||1949–1953||93||3||106||4||style=text-align:left|||3||||
|-
!scope=row| $
|DF||2011–2013||89||11||106||12||style=text-align:left|||—||||
|-
!scope=row|
|HB||1949–1954||97||0||105||0||—||—||||
|-
!scope=row|
|FW||1984–1987||92||38||105||43||style=text-align:left| youth||—||||
|-
!scope=row|
|MF||2011–2014||88||7||105||13||style=text-align:left| English Schools||—||||
|-
!scope=row|
|FW||1966–1968||83||35||104||45||style=text-align:left|||0||||
|-
!scope=row|
|FW||1910–1914||97||47||103||48||—||—||||
|-
!scope=row|
|FW||1892–1896||96||62||103||64||—||—||||
|-
!scope=row|
|HB||1911–1915||96||3||103||4||—||—||||
|-
!scope=row|
|MF||1977–1980||92||4||103||4||style=text-align:left|||0||||
|-
!scope=row|
|U||1896–1899||91||14||103||15||—||—||||
|-
!scope=row|
|DF||1998–2000||87||6||103||11||—||—||||
|-
!scope=row|
|FW||1998–2002||83||8||103||13||style=text-align:left|||0||||
|-
!scope=row| $
|DF||1980–1983||92||3||102||3||style=text-align:left|||10||||
|-
!scope=row|
|DF||1985–1988||89||1||102||1||style=text-align:left| England B||—||||
|-
!scope=row| $
|MF||1994–1997||77||18||102||25||—||—||||
|-
!scope=row|
|DF||1994–1996||72||0||102||3||—||—||||
|-
!scope=row|
|FW||2019–2022||96||7||101||9||||||||
|-
!scope=row|
|DF||1999–2001||85||7||101||8||style=text-align:left|||—||||
|}

Players with fewer than 100 appearances

Footnotes

Player statistics include games played while on loan from clubs listed below. Unless individually sourced, loaning clubs come from the appearances source or 

ReferencesGeneralPlayer of the YearSpecific'''

Sources
 
 
 
 
 
 

 
Birmingham City
Players
Association football player non-biographical articles